Mitta Mitta is the name of several places in Australia:

Mitta Mitta, New South Wales, a farming community 
Mitta Mitta, Victoria, a small town
Mitta Mitta Airport, Victoria
Mitta Mitta River, a major tributary of the Murray River in Victoria, Australia

See also
Mitta (disambiguation)